Barrhead Football Club was a Scottish association football club based in the town of Barrhead, Renfrewshire. The club was founded in 1874 and disbanded in 1882. The club competed in the Scottish Cup for eight seasons between 1874 and 1882. The club's home colours were dark blue shirts with white shorts.

References

Defunct football clubs in Scotland
Association football clubs established in 1874
1874 establishments in Scotland
Association football clubs disestablished in 1882
1882 disestablishments in Scotland
Football in East Renfrewshire
Barrhead